The Iranian women participated actively in constitutional, struggles. From the year 1906 women's organizations were formed and many women participated in constitutionalism. But the National Women's Movement was just a minority movement and part of the great national movement of Iran with the goal of the independence of the country and the implementation of the constitution. The participation of women in these political events was spontaneous, with their new nationalist sentiment and willingness to be recognized.

Women's organizations were assorted and numerous in the Constitutional Revolution. During the first period of the Iranian Constitutional Revolution, the establishment of the right to equality and the elimination of oppression of women, were numerous.

The external activities of women increased during the political transformations of the Constitutional Revolution. Private associations and secret organizations, participation in demonstrations, and for constitutionalism, both armed struggle and non-violent acts were some of the activities that the women held and contributed. Although the Constitution of the Persian Constitution of 1906 eventually neglected many of women's rights (Marriage laws, divorces, child care, etc.), women were deprived of their right to vote, along with those known as criminals.

Background
In the Qajar period, women's attitudes to acceptance were fate and surrender. For example, girls were taught to sit quietly and have little mobility, not to question and had to obey men-even their younger brother. This socialization pattern continued until many periods later.

At that time, no social group could defend its rights and interests. This became more intense for women in terms of the gender segregation that existed at that time. They were faced severe restrictions, such as being deprived in relationship and interaction with the outside world.

The beginning of the constitution
 
In the early stages of the Constitutional Revolution (late 1891 – early 1901), women were mostly influenced by clerics. But, because of their support for constitutionalism, they managed to emerge from their homes and participated in demonstrations and other behaviors that were considered non-traditional, such as the "rioting of bread". Slowly the movement of women became more tangible and more independent. They set up associations, private courses, and did social awareness activities which made them become more active and grew higher in the world outside their homes.

Some women's associations and organizations organized armed battles for constitution. For example, in the armed struggle between pro-opposition and constitutional opposition in Azerbaijan, 20 women were found dead in men's clothing. In 1911, when it was rumored that some parliamentarians gave up themselves to the demands of the Russians, about 300 women went to the parliament with a pistol to force them to protect the country's freedom and territorial integrity. In Azerbaijan, we can see the Zainab Pasha uprising in 1931.  This was when the armed struggle began to rise, many women were secretly involved in men's clothing, and some of them were accidentally known. For example, a soldier who had been injured and was to be treated at the clinic refused any therapy. The refusing reached to the point where Sattar Khan came and asks him, "My son, you should not die. We need your strength, we need your iron will. Why don't you let them cure your wound? And the soldier in whispers in his ear, saying that I am a woman". 

Another recorded case illustrates that during one of the fights in Azerbaijan, a group of 20 dead constitutionalists were found and, it became clear that all of them were women.  

Women's associations did a lot of non-violent actions in defense of the constitution, as well as forcing Britain and Russia to leave Iran. Also during the establishment of the National bank by the Parliament, they sold jewelries and purchased shares from the government. Modern women were boycotting foreign goods, for example, they tried to persuade cafes to shut down sugar imports.
 
These associations held massive meetings about the role of women in the 1911 national movement to remove Britain and Russia from Iran. At one of the meetings between the women's associations and the Russian delegation, the panel tried to convince women that, because the Iranian constitution does not observe women's rights in Iran, they should not try to protect it. But the women's groups’ responses were that they are dissatisfied with their own circumstances, and the culprit is the political complexity of the presence of foreign powers. 

The women's groups even contacted women activists in England in 1911, asking them to use the British government's political influence to support the Iranians. But, unfortunately, they responded that they have no political privilege in their government and power to support the Iranian people.

Women and Conquer Tehran in the Constitutional Revolution 

Commander Bibi Maryam Bakhtiari known as the daughter of Hossein Gholi Khan Ilkhani, sister of Ali-Qoli Khan Bakhtiari, Commander Asad, and wife of Zargham Al-Saltanah Bakhtiari, was one of the constitutional revolutionary women. She was a well-educated and an enlightened woman during that period of time. Bibi Maryam rose to support freedom-loving ones and did not hesitate to do anything about it. She was also an expert in shooting and horse racing techniques. Since she was the Khan's spouse, she had the opportunity to be in charge of horse riders, and was supported by constitutionalists at urgent times of wars. Commander Bibi Maryam Bakhtiari was one of the main proponents of Ali-Qoli Khan Bakhtiari to conquer Tehran. She wrote in various letters and telegrams between the heads of the tribe and the spectacular speeches of the tribe's leaders to fight the minor tyranny (Mohammad Ali Shah Qajar's tyranny). Bibi Maryam was also known as one of the anti-colonial and authoritarian characters of the Qajar era.

Commander Bibi Maryam Bakhtiari, before the Triumph of Tehran, secretly entered Tehran with some of the riders and settled down in her father's house, Hossein Saghafi. Once the attack on Sardar Asad was brought to Tehran, she stoned the roof of the house overlooking Baharestan Square, and with some of Bakhtiari's riders, engaged in the war. She even captured a gun herself and fought with Ghazaghan. Her role in conquering Tehran increased her popularity in the tribe and gained a lot of supporters, who honored her as a commander.

Women's organizations 
The great constitutional writers like Ahmad Kasravi, Melkzadeh, Adamiat, Nezam Mafi, Mohit Mafi, Nazem al-Islam Kermani, Safa'i, Sediqeh Dowlatabadi, and Rezvani conceive in their works references to women's organizations in the revolution: 

There is no information from these associations, since many of them had worked in secret. Morgan Schuster also writes in the book, "The Strangling of Persia" on how he had dealt with the women constitutional associations several times. For example, once through the Treasury Office Secretary, he and his wife were told not to go with the monarchists. When he asked how you know about my spouse coming and going with the monarchists, he gets the response that your spouse's mother who is a member of the women's secret associations had sent the message.

Women's organizations: 
 Women's Freedom Association in 1907 
 Patriotic Drug Association in 1910 
 Women's Absence Union in 1907
 Iranian Women's Association in 1910 
 Native Women's Association in 1910 
 Khatoon Iran Co. 1910 
 Women's Union in 1911
 Great Women's Efforts Association in 1911
 Central Board of Great Women Council in 1911

After the Constitutional Revolution 
Only a few pro-constitutional women were activists for women's rights. The first women who participated in the Iranian Women's Rights Movement were constitutionalists themselves or activists of the national movement of the 1901 such as Sediqeh Dowlatabadi, Banoo Amir Sahi Mahsultan, or those from nationalistic intellectual families, such as Mohtaram Eskandari. After the constitutional went down, the mass of uneducated women returned to their former affiliations, and only the educated and enlightened women of the Women's Rights Movement continued their activities for women rights. 

At that time, constitutional intellectual men such as Mirzadeh Eshghi, Malkolshaera Bahar and Iraj Mirza supported the newly-created Women's Rights Movement, especially the right to education and the abandonment of the veil. For example, on 12 August 1911, Haj Mohammad Taghi Vakilalaraia, the parliament's first MP in Iran, raised the issue of equality between men and women in the Shura Council and called for women's right to vote. This shocked the parliament and faced opposition from one of the clerics in the parliament.

Although these supports were not very fruitful, but they were more significant than supporting the demands of women during the 1979 revolution.

Sediqeh Dowlatabadi

Sediqeh Dowlatabadi (1882–1982) was an Iranian journalist and activist of the Constitutional Revolution and the Women's Movement in Iran. She was the founder of the constitutional forum of the Patriotic Association.

She later became the first female rights activist in Iran and published the Women's Language Journal on women's rights. Dowlatabadi was born in Isfahan in 1882. Her father's name was Haj Mirza Hadi Dolatabadi and her mother's name was Khatemeh Bigom. Her father was known as a modern cleric of that time. Sedigheh Dowlatabadi began her education in Persian and Arabic in Tehran. Then she continued her secondary education at Dar Al Fonoun. She was fifteen years old when she married Dr. Adzad Al-Hakma. But, their marriage didn't last long. In 1917, with her efforts, she opened one of the first elementary girls' schools, named "Shariah School". Her father, Haj Seyyed Mirza Hadi Dolatabadi, was a well-known local and renowned clergyman who led the elderly branch of Babiyah. He was the representative of Sobeh Azal in Iran. The events leading up to the Constitutional Revolution opened a new chapter in the life of Yahya Dolatabadi and his younger brother Ali Mohammed. They were among the first members of the small but influential circle of elderly believers (Azali) who included Sayyid Jamal al-Din Va'iz and Malik Al-Mutkelimin. The thoughts of Sheikh Mohammad Munshahidi Yazdi, who was said to be from the Azali believers had influenced him along with Jamal Al-Din Vaez Esfahani and Malik Al-Mutkelimin.

Sediqeh Dowlatabadi died in Tehran on 6 August 1961 at the age of 80. She was buried next to her brother in the cemetery of Imam Zadeh Esmail in Zargerte. Some ruined her tomb after the 1979 revolution.

See also
 Iranian Constitutional Revolution
 Women's Freedom Association  
 Women's Movement in Iran  
 Jam'iyat-e Nesvan-e Vatankhah  
 Mokhadarat Vatan Association
 Iranian women  
 Constitutional Revolution's Associations

Notes

References
Janet Afari. Women's Semi-constitutions in the Constitutional Movement. Translation by Dr. Javad Yousefian. Published by Bannu Newspaper 1996 translated in 1998., 
 parsa Banab یونس. تاریخ احزاب سیاسی ایران.   
 Eliz Sanasarian. The Women's Rights Movements in Iran. Praeger, New York: 1982, . (Original from the University of Michigan)
 Eliz Sanasarian. The Women's Rights Movements in Iran.(Revolt, decline, and repression from 1901 to 1979 revolution). Translation by Noushin Ahmadi Khorasani. First print, Tehran: Published by Akhtaran, 2005.,.

External links

Reza Jamāli in conversation with Dr Abbās Amānat, Professor of History and International and Area Studies at University of Yale, in Persian, Radio Zamaneh, August 7, 2008 (Audio recording).
Shokā Sahrāi, Photographs of the Constitutional Revolution of Iran, in Persian, Jadid Online, 2007.Slide Show, narrated by Dr Bāqer Āqeli, Jadid Online, 2007: (4 min 30 sec).
Constitutional Revolution of Iran

Persian Constitutional Revolution
Feminist organisations in Iran
Women's rights movement in Iran
Women in revolutions
History of women in Iran